Germán López may refer to:

 Germán López (politician) (1919-1989), Argentine politician
 Germán López (tennis) (born 1971), Spanish tennis player